Vossloh AG is a rail technology company based in Werdohl in the state of North Rhine-Westphalia, Germany. The SDAX-listed group has achieved sales of around €930 million in 2016 with more than 4,000 employees (as of 2017).

Vossloh is a global market leader both for rail fasteners and switch systems. In North America, Vossloh is the leading manufacturer of concrete railway ties, and in relation to track maintenance, they offer a globally unique grinding technology, so-called high speed grinding.

Customers are generally public and private railway companies, network operators as well as regional and municipal transport companies.

Since the restructuring, Vossloh has been focusing on target markets China, the USA, Russia and Western Europe. Important European production sites of Vosslohs are located in Germany, France, Luxembourg, Poland and Scandinavia. In addition, the group has subsidiaries in Asia, North and South America, Australia and Russia.

History
The company is named after Eduard Vossloh. In 1883, the blacksmith received the first contract from the Royal Prussian Railway for the manufacture of spring washers for rail fasteners. On July 11, 1888 the Eduard Vossloh Company was registered. Spring washers and other hardware items were manufactured at the family's blacksmiths shop. Even today, Werdohl is still the headquarters of Vossloh AG and Vossloh Fastening Systems GmbH (Core Components division).

Through the early 1900s the company continued to grow, producing general hardware including decorative items and lampholders for electric lights.

In 1945 the facilities in Werdohl were destroyed by a bomb. Subsidiaries marketing lampholders which are located in Kaliningrad, Wroclaw and East Germany ceased to be part of the company due to the changes in political borders at that time.

In 1946 production of holders for fluorescent tubes was allowed to take place at a plant in Lüdenscheid, by 1962 an additional plant for lighting products had opened in Selm and the Vossloh works employed 1,300 people, with 500 more employed in subsidiaries. 1967 was a decisive turning Point: Vossloh obtained a license to produce a new tension clamp rail fastening developed by Prof.  Hermann Meier director of the Deutsche Bundesbahn.

Recession in Germany in the 1980s resulted in the closure of two plants and employee lay-offs reducing the staff by almost half. Management was brought in from outside the Vossloh family, and Schwabe GmbH acquired; its lighting ballast products complementing Vossloh's lighting fittings product range, and on 1 December 1989 Vossloh-Werke GmbH became a public stock company or Aktiengesellschaft (AG).  At this time there were three company divisions : Vossloh-Werke GmbH (Werdohl)  (railway components e.g. tension clamps), Vossloh-Schwabe GmbH (Urbach) (electrical lighting products and components), and Hansa Metallwarengesellschaft mbH Thiessen & Hager (decorative products, sunscreen products).

The current listed company was founded in 1990. On June 13, 1990, the shares of Vossloh AG were listed on the Düsseldorf Stock Exchange for the first time. In the 1990s, the reunification of Germany resulted, and new markets in eastern Europe resulted in additional demand for its rail fastening products on the former Deutsche Reichsbahn and elsewhere. Hoesch Maschinenfabrik Deutschland GmbH and W. Hegenscheidt GmbH manufacturers of railway wheelset machining equipment were acquired in the mid 1990s. In 1997 the company was first listed on the MDAX.  In 1998 railway switch manufacturing company VAE group was acquired by Voestalpine AG and Vossloh.

However recession in the 1990s resulted in the sale of the non-'recession-resilient' decorative products division to Arquati S.p.A. of Italy in 1997. Under company CEO Burkhard Schuchmann Vossloh was re-orientated as a rail industry based company during and after the 1990s; In 2002 the lighting division was sold to Matsushita Electric Works, Ltd. of Osaka, Japan, and the company expanded into the rail industry market with a number of acquisitions:

1996: Rail related parts of the Deutsche System Technik GmbH company (traffic management and electronic information systems) are acquired after insolvency, forming Vossloh System-Technik GmbH
1998: The former Krupp Maschinenbau Kiel, then under Siemens' ownership as Siemens Schienenfahrzeugtechnik
1998: MAN Systemelektronik acquired and added to Vossloh System-Technik GmbH
2000: Vossloh and Angel Trains formed a locomotive leasing business - Locomotion Partners consisting of two companies:  Locomotion capital Ltd. (90% owned by Angel trains, 10% Vossloh): a locomotive procurement, rental and management company initially headquartered in London.  Locomotion Service GmbH (90% owned by Vossloh, 10% Angel trains): a locomotive servicing and modification company that would initially contract its work to Vossloh SFT in Kiel.  The companies would not exclusively hire and service only Vossloh locomotives, and would act independently, depending on the circumstances.] In 2004 the 10% stake in Locomotion capital Ltd. was sold and the stake in Locomotion Service GmbH increased to 100%.
2001: A 55% stake in NovoSignal AB (Sweden), designers of electronic interlocking and process control systems
2001: (VAE systems acquires Transwerk Perway Pty. Ltd (South Africa), railroad switch manufacturer)
2002: Passenger information and entertainment systems unit of Bombardier Transportation, Germany
2002: Cogifer group (France) (Division Customized Modules) is acquired, and Vossloh's share in VAE group is sold to Voestalpine   The Société de Construction et d’Embranchements Industriels (SEI) was founded in 1904 in Reichshoffen, Alsace, to manufacture rail switches. Reichshoffen is still an important location today. One of the French switch plants has its headquarters here, as does the technology center of Vossloh Cogifer.
2002: Kiepe Elektrik (Düsseldorf, Germany)
2002: Skamo (Nowe Skalmierzyce, Poland); railroad switch manufacturer.
2003: MIN Skretnice (Serbia); railroad switch manufacturer.
2004: The diesel locomotive manufacturer formerly known as Meinfesa (in Valencia, Spain) was acquired from Alstom during that company's time of financial difficulties.
2004: Swedish Rail Systems AB (Sweden); railroad switch manufacturer
2004: Delkor Pty.  (Australia); railroad switch manufacturer
2004: JS Industries Private Ltd., (Hyderabad, India); 51% of shares of railroad switch manufacturer
2005: Daksin Transtek Ltd. (Bangalore, India); railroad switch manufacturer - joint venture with Patil group (Patil Rail Infrastructure Pvt. Ltd, India)
2005: Beekay Engineering & Castings Ltd. (India), 60% acquired by Vossloh Cogifer

At the end of 2005 Burkard Schuchmann is succeeded by Dr. Gerhard Eschenröder as CEO until 2007 when Werner Andree replaces him. The subsidiary, Vossloh Information Technologies GmbH was sold (February 2007) to Funkwerk AG.  The company continued to expand; its first acquisition in North America was Pohl Corp (switch manufacturer), followed by Cleveland Track Material Inc., both acquired in 2007.  A 100% stake in French rail infrastructure company  (ETF) was also obtained in 2007. The same year the company opened a rail fastening subsidiary in China.

In 2008 Vossloh infrastructure services is sold to the VINCI group of companies - this included the infrastructure parts of Cogifer SA acquired in 2002 as well as Européenne de Travaux Ferroviaires SA.

Further railroad switch manufacturers were acquired :TLK Rail (Australia) in 2007, Sportek (Denmark) and Kloos Oving B.V. (Netherlands) in 2008, and the switch and rail manufacturing parts of the Nouva Sima Sud company (Italy) in 2009.

In 2010 the company enters the rail services market in Germany, forming Vossloh Rail Services GmbH from the rail maintenance parts of Stahlberg-Roensch Group in addition to LOG Logistikgesellschaft Gleisbau mbH and ISB Instandhaltungssysteme Bahn GmbH. A rail milling and grinding joint venture Vossloh MFL Rail Milling GmbH, was formed in association with Maschinenfabrik Liezen und Giesserei in 2012.

In mid 2013 Knorr-Bremse owner Heinz Hermann Thiele became chairman of the Vossloh board, after having raised his shareholding in the company from below 5% to over 10% in Mar. 2011, and to over 25% in 2013. Thiele's election to chair was opposed by the Vossloh family who owned over 30% of the shares. In November 2013 the Vossloh family unexpectedly sold 22% of its shareholding, reducing their holding to under 10% and leaving Heinz Hermann Thiele as the main shareholder in the company.

In 2014 the company began a restructuring. New executive board members were introduced and high level management numbers were reduced by a third, and talks started on general workforce redundancies. The transfer of locomotive production in Kiel to a more modern site was also under investigation, with three sites identified. In June 2014 Kieler Nachrichten reported that an offer had been made for Voith's locomotive plant, however in July the company announced it was to build a new plant at a cost of €30 million in the Suchsdorf area of Kiel. A groundbreaking ceremony for the new plant took place 17 July 2015.

In December 2014 the company announced it intended to divest its transportation division. The rail-vehicles division was announced as sold to Stadler in late 2015. The Electrical Systems division (formerly Vossloh Kiepe) was sold to Knorr-Bremse in 2016.

End of 2016, Vossloh acquired Rocla Concrete Tie, Inc., headquartered in Lakewood, Colorado from Altus Capital Partners II. Since 1986 the North American company mainly supplies customers in the USA focus market with concrete thresholds. At the same time, Vossloh has purchased the remaining 50% of the shares in the previous Alpha Rail Team joint venture.

Company structure
Vossloh has three divisions contribute to the core business, rail infrastructure: Core Components, Customized Modules and Lifecycle Solutions.

Vossloh currently operates with four divisions. The fourth division, Transportation, covers the developing and manufacturing of diesel locomotives, and also provides all necessary locomotive maintenance and repair services. With the adoption of the strategy at the end of 2014, the Transportation division stopped being part of the core business.

The individual companies are centrally coordinated by the holding company, Vossloh AG, and operate in common under the Vossloh brand.

Core Components 
The Core Components division manufactures standardized products on an industrial scale, which are required in large quantities for rail infrastructure.

Vossloh's business unit Fastening Systems produces rail fastening systems and components, which are used in more than 65 countries. The screw-fastened and maintenance-free elastic systems are suitable for all applications: ballasted and slab tracks, mainline and conventional lines, high-speed lines, heavy-haul and local transport. Approx. 50 million tension clamps leave Vossloh's production sites in Europe, Asia and North America every year.

The division includes Vossloh Fastening Systems GmbH (Werdohl Germany), Delkor Rail Pty. Ltd. (Australia), Patil Vossloh Rail Systems Pvt. Ltd. (joint venture with Patil Group of India), Vossloh Sistemi s.r.l. (Italy), TOO "Vossloh-Kaz" (Russia), Vossloh Utenzilija d.d. (Croatia), Vossloh Skamo Sp. z o.o. (Poland), Vossloh Tehnika Feroviara S.R.L. (Romania), Vossloh Drážní Technika s.r.o. (Czech Republic), Vossloh Rail Technology Limitet Sirketi (Turkey), Feder-7 GmbH (Hungary) and Vossloh Fastening Systems America Corporation (Chicago, USA).

Vossloh's business unit Tie Technologies is manufacturing concrete railway ties in North America. In addition, six own production sites in the USA and another one in Mexico also produce switch ties, concrete low-vibration track blocks and crossing panels.

Customized Modules
The Customized Modules division develops and manufactures systems for rail infrastructure, which must be individually adapted to the customer and the project. Installation and maintenance are related Vossloh services.

Vossloh Cogifer produces railway switch systems at over 30 production sites in over 20 countries: Vossloh Nordic Switch systems AB (Sweden), KIHN (Luxembourg), Vossloh Track Material Inc. (Wilmington USA) and Cleveland Track Material Inc. (Cleveland USA) and Vossloh Cogifer Australia Pty., as well as two joint ventures Corus Cogifer Switches and Crossings, (Scunthorpe, UK) and Amurrio Ferrocarril y Equipos SA (Spain).

From 2012 Corus Cogifer Switches and Crossings was rebranded as VTS Track Technology Ltd. due to the acquisition of Corus by Tata Steel and of Cogifer by Vossloh.

Vossloh is a majority shareholder in a joint venture with the Argentine state owned infrastructure company ADIFSE called Vossloh Cogifer Argentina SA created in 2013, with a production plant located near the city of La Plata.

Amongst turnouts and crossings, Vossloh manufactures manganese frogs, switch blade, switch actuators and locking devices, signalling products and rail monitoring systems. The Vossloh offer covers all fields of application: standard, high-speed, special and heavy-haul switches, as well as solutions for urban networks.

Lifecycle Solutions 
The Lifecycle Solutions division of Vossloh provides track related services. This includes welding and transportation of long rails, maintenance and preventative care of tracks and switches and reconditioning and recycling of old rails. These services also cover the lifecycle management of entire track sections.

Vossloh Rail Services provides railway track infrastructure maintenance such as rail grinding, welding, replacement and testing. The division was formed in 2010 with the acquisition of parts of the Stahlberg-Roensch Group and Logistikgesellschaft Gleisbau mbH and Instandhaltungssysteme Bahn GmbH from the Contrack Group.

Transportation 
The Transportation division produces locomotives and provides related services.

Vossloh Locomotives GmbH, the former MaK locomotive plant in Kiel produces diesel-electric and diesel-hydraulic centre-cab locomotives, for freight and shunting purposes, which are fitted with eco-friendly technology and are approved in many European countries.

This is complemented by services related to the maintenance and repair of locomotives, including variable financing models and options for maintenance agreements. ECM-compliant service centers are located in Germany, France and Italy. The pan-European service network also includes partner workshops and collaborations, in Sweden.

The factory's main production up to 2009 was diesel hydraulic locomotives of type Vossloh G1000 BB, Vossloh G1206, Vossloh G1700 BB and Vossloh G2000 BB. The company's major orders included G1206/1700 variants for the French (SNCF Class BB 61000) and Swiss railways (SBB Am 843).

A three axle shunting locomotive, type Vossloh G6 was introduced in 2008, in 2009 the company announced to the intention to offer diesel electric or diesel hydraulic variant of four axle centre cab locomotives in two power ranges: G 12 or DE 12 and G 18 or DE 18 (approximately corresponding to the power ranges of the G1206 and G1700 versions.)

In 2016, Vossloh Locomotives won a major contract in France. Akiem S.A.S. ordered 44 locomotives of DE 18.

Spin-offs, divestments, and subsidiaries

In 2000 Vossloh and Angel Trains formed a locomotive leasing business - Locomotion Partners consisting of two companies:
Locomotion capital Ltd. (90% owned by Angel trains, 10% Vossloh) : a locomotive procurement, rental and management company initially headquartered in London.
Locomotion Service GmbH (90% owned by Vossloh, 10% Angel trains) : a locomotive servicing and modification company that would initially contract its work to Vossloh SFT in Kiel.

The companies would not exclusively hire and service only Vossloh locomotives, and would act independently, depending on the circumstances. In 2004 the 10% stake in Locomotion capital Ltd. was sold and the stake in Locomotion Service GmbH increased to 100%.

Vossloh Rail Vehicles
Vossloh Rail Vehicles (formerly Vossloh España S.A.) was acquired from Alstom c.2005. The former Meinfesa plant produced diesel electric locomotives as well as passenger multiple units, trams and bogies.

The company's locomotive output has included the SNCF BB 460000 (in cooperation with Alstom) and Vossloh Euro locomotives.

In 2010 the company launched a new locomotive type: the diesel electric Eurolight locomotive, designed for railways requiring axleloads less than 20t, and with either 2.3 or 2.8MW installed engine power. In September 2012, Vossloh unveiled a mockup of the  "Desert Hawk" locomotive, a single ended development of its Euro locomotive design intended for use in push-pull passenger trains in hot and sandy conditions. The rail-vehicles division was announced as sold to Stadler in late 2015.

Vossloh Kiepe

Vossloh Kiepe GmbH produces electrical systems for light rail, trolleybuses and hybrid buses including electric propulsion and control, air conditioning and heating as well as passenger rail vehicle refurbishment and modernisation. The business (as Vossloh Electrical Systems) was sold in late 2016 to Knorr-Bremse.

See also 

Voestalpine : competitor in the rail turnout business
Pandrol : competitor in the rail fastening business

Notes

References

External links

Vossloh Locomotives

 
German brands
Manufacturing companies established in 1888
German companies established in 1888